Arrunden is a hamlet in the civil parish of Holme Valley, West Yorkshire, England.

External links

Villages in West Yorkshire